Rosane Quintella (1959 - 2020) was a botanical artist and teacher from Brazil.

Quintella was born 25 February 1959. 

She studied at the School of Music and Fine Arts of Paraná at the Curitiba campus of the University of the State of Paraná in Brazil, graduating in the plastic arts in 1982. Later, in 1992, she took a bachelor's degree in biology from the Pontifical Catholic University of Paraná and then a specialist course in illustration in 2002. In 2005 she was the 17th Margaret Mee Fellow in Botanical Illustration at Kew Gardens. She then became a director of the Paraná Botanical Illustration Center (Centro de Ilustração Botânica do Paraná) in Curitiba and taught botanical illustration until 2019. 

She worked in watercolours as well as pen and ink for technical illustrations. Her work is within the collections of the Royal Botanic Gardens, Kew including the Shirley Sherwood Gallery. 

She died 11th September 2020.

References

1959 births
2020 deaths
Botanical illustrators
Brazilian illustrators
Brazilian women artists
People from São Paulo